H34 may refer to:
 Hanriot H.34, a French trainer aircraft
 , a British H-class submarine
 Huntsville Municipal Airport (Arkansas)
 Sikorsky H-34, an American helicopter